The Team Rocket F1 Rocket is a two-seat sport plane formerly built in Czech Republic and marketed as a kit for amateur construction by Team Rocket of Texas, United States. As of April 2017, the aircraft is being produced in the U.S. under license from Team Rocket by Frazier Aviation of Indiana.

Development and design
The F1 Rocket is a tandem two-seat low-wing cantilever monoplane built mainly in aluminum. The Rocket has a titanium fixed conventional landing gear with a tailwheel. Designed to be built with a range of nose-mounted engines between 235 and 350 hp (175 and 224 kW) the prototype has a Lycoming IO-540 with a three-bladed propeller. The F1 has tandem seating for two with a rear-sliding canopy and a fixed windscreen. Tip up canopies are also used. The prototype first flew in the United States in November 2000 and by 2003 seven others had flown. By late 2017, over 130 had flown.

Variants
F1 Rocket
Tandem-seat variant using a 6 cylinder Lycoming IO-540 or Continental IO-550 engine of 250-350 HP. The wing on the F1 is similar to the Vans RV-4 wing, a rectangular design with slotted ailerons, and bottom hinged flaps. The canopy may be a slider or flip over design, but most use the slider design.

F1 Evo Evolutionary variant design, utilized a tapered wing as compared to the rectangular wing on the F1.  Significant changes were made to the aileron and flap design.  F1 Evo uses the same fuselage and tail as the original F1. The Evo wing is no longer available.

F4 RaiderTandem-seat variant using a 4-cylinder Lycoming or clone.

Specifications (F1 Rocket)

References

Notes

Bibliography

Homebuilt aircraft
2000s United States sport aircraft